Nymphargus ocellatus (common name: spotted Cochran frog)  is a species of frog in the family Centrolenidae. It is endemic to the Amazonian slopes of Andes in Peru.
Its natural habitats are tropical moist montane forests (cloud forests); larvae develop in streams. It is threatened by habitat loss.

References

ocellatus
Amphibians of Peru
Endemic fauna of Peru
Taxonomy articles created by Polbot
Amphibians described in 1918